Pithecopus centralis is a species of frog in the subfamily Phyllomedusinae. It is endemic to Brazil.
Its natural habitats are moist savanna, subtropical or tropical moist shrubland, and rivers. It is threatened by habitat loss.

References

Phyllomedusinae
Endemic fauna of Brazil
Amphibians described in 1965
Taxonomy articles created by Polbot